Panathinaikos Fencing Club is the fencing department of Panathinaikos A.O., the Greek multi-sport club based in Athens and is one of the most successful departments of the club. The home ground of the team is in the Apostolos Nikolaidis Stadium.

The department was founded in 1912 by John Cyril Campbell and was refounded in 1960 after World War II.

Notable fencers

  Anna Bourdakou
  Dimitris Chatzisarantos
  Ioannis Hatzisarantos
  Markos Chatzisarantos
  Panagiotis Dourakos
  Giannis Ioannidis
  Savvas Kavadias
  Vasiliki Koumbani
  Giannis Merkatatis
  Andreas Vgenopoulos
  Despina Georgiadou

Notable coaches
  John Cyril Campbell
  Xenophon Chatzisarantos
  Dimitris Kazaglis

Honours
 Greek Championship, Overall Standings: (13): 1963, 1964, 1965, 1966, 1967, 1968, 1969, 1970, 1971, 1972, 1973, 1974, 1975

 Greek Foil team Championship, Men: (12): 1965, 1966, 1967, 1968, 1969, 1970, 1971, 1972, 1973, 1975, 1977, 1978
 Greek Épée team Championship, Men: (14): 1964, 1965, 1966, 1967, 1969, 1970, 1971, 1972, 1973, 1974, 1975, 1976, 1977, 1980
 Greek Sabre team Championship, Men: (8): 1962, 1964, 1966, 1970, 1971, 1972, 1973, 1974

References

Sources
 100 years Panathinaikos, Liveri, 2008
 Official website 
 fencing federation website, (Hellenic Fencing Federation)

External links
 Official website

Panathinaikos A.O.
Fencing in Greece
Sports clubs established in 1912
1912 establishments in Greece